San Mango may refer to several places of Italy:

San Mango Cilento, a hamlet of Sessa Cilento, Province of Salerno, Campania
San Mango d'Aquino, a municipality of the Province of Catanzaro, Calabria
San Mango Piemonte, a municipality of the Province of Salerno, Campania
San Mango sul Calore, a municipality of the Province of Avellino, Campania